Coniobrevicolla is a fungal genus in the family Trichosphaeriaceae. This is a monotypic genus, containing the single species Coniobrevicolla larsenii.

References

Trichosphaeriales
Monotypic Sordariomycetes genera